Tradouw's mountain toad (Capensibufo tradouwi) is a species of toad in the family Bufonidae  endemic to South Africa.
Its natural habitats are Mediterranean-type shrubby vegetation, temperate grassland, rivers, intermittent rivers, swamps, freshwater marshes, and intermittent freshwater marshes. It is threatened by habitat loss.

References

Capensibufo
Endemic amphibians of South Africa
Amphibians described in 1926
Taxa named by John Hewitt (herpetologist)
Taxonomy articles created by Polbot